Robina Jane Sparks, also known as Kate Williamson (September 19, 1931 – December 6, 2013) was an American actress, whose career spanned nearly three decades.

Biography
Williamson was born as Robina Jane Sparks in 1931, the daughter of actress/singer Nydia Westman and writer/producer Salathiel Robert Sparks. She began her acting career in 1977. Most of Williamson's credits were television appearances. She was best known for her roles on Ellen (1995), Disclosure (1994), and Dahmer (2002).

Marriage and Death
She married character actor Al Ruscio in June 1954, and was known to loved ones as "Jane Kate Ruscio". The couple had four children and remained together until Al Ruscio's death in November 2013. Less than a month later, Williamson died following a prolonged illness on December 6, 2013, aged 82, in Encino, Los Angeles, California. She was survived by her four children and five grandchildren.

References

External links

1931 births
2013 deaths
American television actresses
American film actresses
20th-century American actresses
21st-century American actresses
Actresses from New York (state)